Weerth is a surname. Notable people with the surname include:

 Georg Weerth (1822–1856), German writer and poet
 Ernest de Weerth (1894–1967), French-American theatrical designer
 Ferdinand Weerth (1774–1836), German pastor

See also
 Werth